In linguistics, a paroxytone is a word with stress on the penultimate syllable, that is, the second last syllable, such as the English word potáto.

In English, most words ending in –ic are paroxytones: músic, frántic, and phonétic; but not rhétoric, aríthmetic (noun), and Árabic.

In Italian and Portuguese, most words are paroxytons. In Polish, almost all words are paroxytones, except for certain verb conjugations and a few words of foreign origin.

In medieval Latin lyric poetry, a paroxytonic line or half-line is one in which the penultimate syllable is stressed, as in the second half of the verse "Estuans intrinsecus || ira vehementi."

Related concepts are proparoxytone (stress on the third last syllable) and oxytone (stress on the last syllable).

See also 
Barytone
Oxytone
Penult
Perispomenon
Preantepenult
Proparoxytone
Properispomenon
Ultima (syllable)
Stress (linguistics)

References

Phonology
Stress (linguistics)